The 2010–11 Dallas Mavericks season was the 31st season of the franchise in the National Basketball Association (NBA).

This season would prove to be the most successful season for the Mavericks. In the playoffs, the Mavericks defeated the Portland Trail Blazers in six games in the First Round, then swept the defending two-time NBA champion Los Angeles Lakers in four games in the semi-finals, before defeating the Oklahoma City Thunder in five games in the Conference Finals to reach the NBA Finals for the first time since 2006. In the NBA Finals, the Mavericks faced off against the Miami Heat in a rematch of the 2006 NBA Finals, and the Heat were led by their Big Three of LeBron James, Dwyane Wade, and Chris Bosh. The Mavericks would go on to defeat the Heat in six games in the NBA Finals, winning their first NBA championship in franchise history. This would be their last playoff series win until 2022.

The Mavericks' championship was the first major sports championship in the Dallas-Fort Worth area since the Dallas Stars in 1999, and the first title in Mavericks franchise history. The Mavericks became the third team to win an NBA title in the state of Texas, joining the Houston Rockets and San Antonio Spurs. The Mavericks are also the third team to win a major sports championship in the Dallas-Fort Worth area, joining the Dallas Cowboys and the Dallas Stars. The Mavericks championship parade was held on June 16, 2011 in downtown Dallas.

Key dates
 June 24 – The 2010 NBA draft was held in New York City.
 July 1 – The free agency period began.

Transactions

Summary
In the 2010 NBA Draft the Mavericks selected Nigerian center Solomon Alabi with the 20th pick in the second round(50th overall) who was traded directly to the Toronto Raptors for a future second-round pick and cash considerations.

The Mavericks sent $3 million to the Memphis Grizzlies to acquire the rights for shooting guard Dominique Jones.

Mavericks free agent Dirk Nowitzki agreed to a 4-year deal worth $80 million to stay with the Mavericks.

Brendan Haywood also decided to stay with the Mavericks as he signed a new 6-year deal worth $55 million. His sixth and last year in this contract is however not fully guaranteed.

Center Ian Mahinmi signed a 2-year deal worth the veteran minimum starting at $850,000.

On July 13, the Mavericks officially signed rookie Dominique Jones.

The Mavericks and the Charlotte Bobcats agreed on a trade that sent Erick Dampier, Matt Carroll and Eduardo Nájera to the Bobcats, while the Bobcats sent Tyson Chandler and Alexis Ajinca to the Mavericks.

On August 12 Tim Thomas signed a 1-year deal to the veteran minimum ($1.35 million). He was rostered the previous season, but left the team to take care of his ill wife. Later, Thomas announced that the illness his wife was suffering from would prevent him from playing for the Mavericks.

NBA Draft

Trades

Free agents

Additions

On January 10, the Mavericks signed Sasha Pavlović to a 10-day contract. He received a second 10-day contract on January 20. On January 30 he was released.

The Mavericks signed Peja Stojaković on January 24, 2011.

Corey Brewer was signed on March 3, 2011.

Subtractions

On January 5, the Mavericks waived Steve Novak before his contract became fully guaranteed.

Roster

|}

Playoffs

|-
| 
| style="background:#0B60AD;color:white;" | 21 || 3 || 18.6 || .419 || .320 || .794 || 1.90 || 3.4 || .29 || .00 || 8.9
|-
| 
|| 0 || 0 || .0 || .000 || .000 || .000 || .00 || .0 || .00 || .00 || .0
|-
| 
|| 6 || 0 || 3.8 || .444 || .333 || .000 || .30 || .2 || .67 || .00 || 1.5
|-
| 
|| 0 || 0 || .0 || .000 || .000 || .000 || .00 || .0 || .00 || .00 || .0
|-
| 
|| 9 || 0 || 4.1 || style="background:#0B60AD;color:white;" | .750 || style="background:#0B60AD;color:white;" | .750 || .500 || .30 || .2 || .11 || .00 || 1.1
|-
| 
| style="background:#0B60AD;color:white;" | 21 || style="background:#0B60AD;color:white;" | 21 || 32.4 || .582 || .000 || .679 || style="background:#0B60AD;color:white;" | 9.20 || .4 || .62 || .90 || 8.0
|-
| 
|| 18 || 0 || 15.3 || .581 || .000 || .465 || 4.10 || .2 || .11 || style="background:#0B60AD;color:white;" | 1.00 || 3.1
|-
| 
|| 0 || 0 || .0 || .000 || .000 || .000 || .00 || .0 || .00 || .00 || .0
|-
| 
| style="background:#0B60AD;color:white;" | 21 || style="background:#0B60AD;color:white;" | 21 || 35.4 || .398 || .374 || .800 || 4.50 || style="background:#0B60AD;color:white;" |7.3 || style="background:#0B60AD;color:white;" | 1.90 || .48 || 9.3
|-
| 
|| 6 || 0 || 5.5 || .600 || .000 || .556 || 1.00 || .0 || .17 || .00 || 1.8
|-
| 
| style="background:#0B60AD;color:white;" | 21 || style="background:#0B60AD;color:white;" | 21 || 32.9 || .467 || .000 || .851 || 6.30 || 2.1 || 1.00 || .90 || 11.9
|-
| 
| style="background:#0B60AD;color:white;" | 21 || style="background:#0B60AD;color:white;" | 21 || style="background:#0B60AD;color:white;" |39.3 || .485 || .460 || style="background:#0B60AD;color:white;" | .941 || 8.10 || 2.5 || .57 || .62 || style="background:#0B60AD;color:white;" |27.7
|-
| 
| style="background:#0B60AD;color:white;" | 21 || 18 || 15.8 || .349 || .397 || .750 || .90 || .6 || .52 || .10 || 4.5
|-
| 
|| 19 || 0 || 18.4 || .408 || .377 || .778 || 1.70 || .4 || .63 || .11 || 7.1
|-
| 
| style="background:#0B60AD;color:white;" | 21 || 0 || 32.6 || .478 || .442 || .843 || 1.90 || 3.2 || 1.24 || .14 || 17.5
|}

Awards, records and milestones

Awards

Week/Month
 Dirk Nowitzki was named Western Conference Player of the Week for games played from November 22 through November 28.
 Dirk Nowitzki was named Western Conference Player of the Week for games played from December 6 through December 12.
 Rick Carlisle was named Western Conference Coach of the Month for games played in February.

All-Star
 Dirk Nowitzki was voted to his 10th NBA All-Star Game.

Season

Playoffs
 Dirk Nowitzki was voted the NBA Finals Most Valuable Player.

Records
 On October 29, Dirk Nowitzki's free-throw streak came to an end at 82, when he missed a free-throw against Memphis. He now holds the record for the third-longest free-throw streak.
 In Game 1 of the Western Conference Finals, Dirk Nowitzki of the Dallas Mavericks set a playoff record for most free throws made without a miss with 24, previously held by Paul Pierce (21) in 2003.

Milestones
 On November 12, Jason Kidd recorded his 11,000th Assist during a game against the Philadelphia 76ers. He is the second player in NBA history to achieve it.
 On May 8, in a playoff game against the Los Angeles Lakers, Brian Cardinal hit the 20th three-pointer of the game, tying what was at the time the record set by the Houston Rockets on May 6, 1996.  The current record belongs to the Cleveland Cavaliers, who hit 25 three-pointers in a game against the Atlanta Hawks on May 4, 2016.
 On June 12, the Dallas Mavericks defeated the Miami Heat in game 6 of the 2011 Finals, to win their first NBA Championship.
 On June 16, a crowd estimated at 200,000 lined the streets of Dallas for the first-ever NBA Championship Victory Parade. A celebration followed inside, at the American Airlines Center for Season ticket holders, and was broadcast on local TV.

Major injuries and surgeries
Rodrigue Beaubois injured his foot during a practice session with the French national squad. Beaubois broke the fifth metatarsal bone in his left foot. He underwent surgery, which was successful. He rebroke his foot, but returned to practice at February 8, 2011. Beaubois made his comeback in a game against Sacramento on February 16.

On January 4, 2011, Caron Butler was ruled out for the rest of the season after undergoing surgery to repair a ruptured right patellar tendon.

Head coach Rick Carlisle did not make the trip to Oklahoma because he was recovering from a minor arthroscopic knee surgery.

During a game against Milwaukee, Caron Butler injured his right knee and did not return to the game. Butler suffered a ruptured right patellar tendon on his right knee, underwent surgery on Tuesday, January 4, and missed the remainder of the season.

During the first quarter of a game against Detroit, Aleksandar Pavlović suffered a broken nose.

Rodrigue Beaubois missed Game 1 of the playoff series against Portland due to a foot sprain. He also missed Games 2–5 of the same series.

Dirk Nowitzki tore a tendon in the middle finger of his left (non-shooting) hand in Game 1 of the NBA Finals.

During the Finals against Miami, Brendan Haywood missed Game 3 due to a strained right hip flexor. He returned to play Game 4, but could not move well and only played a few minutes.

See also
 2010–11 NBA season

References

Dallas Mavericks seasons
Dallas
Western Conference (NBA) championship seasons
NBA championship seasons
Dallas
Dallas
2010s in Dallas